Iron phosphide is a chemical compound of iron and phosphorus, with a formula of FeP. Its physical appearance is grey, hexagonal needles.

Manufacturing of iron phosphide takes place at elevated temperatures, where the elements combine directly. Iron phosphide reacts with moisture and acids producing phosphine (PH3), a toxic and pyrophoric gas.

Iron phosphide can be used as a semiconductor. It has use in high power, high frequency applications, such as laser diodes.

Below a Néel temperature of about 119 K, FeP takes on an helimagnetic structure.

Hazards and mitigation
Iron phosphide is a hazardous substance.

Proper eye protection such as goggles should always be used when handling iron phosphide. It can be very harmful to the eyes, especially for individuals wearing contact lenses. Contact lenses have been known to react poorly with iron phosphide due to its corrosive properties, but the scientific world does not all agree on the use of contact lenses in association with iron phosphide.

In case of inhalation, the person should be moved to fresh air or given artificial respiration if not breathing. In case of ingestion, the person's mouth should be rinsed with water unless unconscious. In case of eye contact, immediate eye flushing is necessary.

References

Iron compounds
Phosphides
Semiconductor materials